Getaway or Get Away may refer to:

Crime scene getaway, the act of fleeing the location of a crime scene
A short vacation or holiday, a leave of absence or a trip for recreation
Getaway (2013 film), an American action thriller film
Getaway (TV series), an Australian travel television series
Getaway (The Saint), a 1932 mystery novel by Leslie Charteris
"Get Away", an episode of the sitcom The King of Queens
 Getaway! (video game), a 1982 crime-themed scrolling maze game for the Atari 8-bit family
 Norwegian Getaway, a 2013 cruise ship

Music

Albums 
 Getaway (The Clean album), 2001
 Getaway (Reef album), 2000
 Getaway (Adelitas Way album), 2016
 Getaway, a 2017 album by the Hunter Brothers
 Get Away, a 1967 album by Georgie Fame
 Getaway - Groups & Sessions, an album by Ritchie Blackmore

Songs 
 "Get Away" (Bobby Brown song), 1993
 "Getaway" (Earth, Wind & Fire song), 1976
 "Get Away" (Georgie Fame song), 1966
 "Get Away" (Mobb Deep song), 2001
 "Get Away" (Rottyful Sky song), 2013
 "Getaway" (Texas song), 2005
 "Getaway" (Vincint song), 2021
 "And Get Away", by The Esquires
 "The Getaway" (Hilary Duff song), by Hilary Duff
 "Get Away", by Badfinger from Ass
 "Get Away", by Big K.R.I.T. from 4eva Is a Mighty Long Time
 "Get Away", by Brian McFadden from Set in Stone
 "Get Away", by Chicago, as a part of the album version from "Hard to Say I'm Sorry"
 "Get Away", by Chris Bell from I Am the Cosmos
 "Get Away", by Christina Milian from the self-titled album
 "Get Away", by CHVRCHES
 "Get Away", by CNBLUE from Code Name Blue
 "Getaway", by Dev from The Night the Sun Came Up
 "Get Away", by Dr. Dog from Be the Void
 "Get Away", the 2002 debut single by Earshot from Letting Go
 "The Getaway", by Immortal Technique from Revolutionary Vol. 1
 "Get Away", by King's X from Ogre Tones
 "Getaway", by Kiss from Dressed to Kill
 "Get Away", by Loudness from Thunder in the East
 "Getaway", by Michelle Branch
 "Get Away", by Mitchel Musso from Brainstorm EP
 "Getaway", by Monica from The Makings of Me
 "Getaway", by The Music from the self-titled album
 "Getaway", by Pearl Jam from Lightning Bolt
 "Getaway", by Stereophonics from You Gotta Go There to Come Back
 "Getaway", by Train from their 2001 album Drops of Jupiter
 "Getaway", by Tritonal featuring Angel Taylor from Painting With Dreams
 "Get Away", by Westlife, B-side of the single "Us Against the World"
 "Get Away", by Yelawolf from Radioactive
 "Get Away", by Yuck from their 2011 eponymous album
"Getaway", by Saint Motel from saintmotelevision

See also
The Getaway (disambiguation)